María Lourdes Sánchez (born 5 March 1986) is an Argentine dancer, television presenter, actress, model, and singer. She is known for having participated in several seasons of the reality show Dancing for a Dream, a segment broadcast within the program Showmatch, which resulted in be a semifinalist in the season 12 (2017) and the season 14 (2019).

Professional career 
Sánchez began her career as a dancer on television after being chosen in a casting for the production of Showmatch in Ciudad de Corrientes to be the dance partner of the designer Jorge Ibañez in the 2008 edition of the
Dancing for a dream conducted by Marcelo Tinelli. The following year, she was once again summoned to form the dance team of the journalist Tití Fernández in the Musical of your dreams, in which they were the twelfth team eliminated. That same year, she is called by Gerardo Sofovich to join the dance corps of the play Gracias a la villa  at the Teatro del Lago in Villa Carlos Paz. From 2010 to 2012, Lourdes was part of the stable cast of Showmatch dancers, who always performed the opening of the programs and assisted both the codnuctor and the participants. During that period, she participated in the Cordoban fiction Locos del toma (2011) and was summoned to be part of the show Excitante produced by Daniel Comba at the Astros Theater.

She was also part of the program La cocina del show (2011–2012) broadcast by eltrece for two years and in turn was signed to be the dance partner by Agustín Morgante in the second edition of Soñando por Bailar. In 2012, Sánchez participated in the sitcom Concubinos on eltrece along with Pedro Alfonso, Paula Chaves, Marcelo de Bellis and Federico Bal, where she played Milagros, a neighbor with very particular tastes. That year, she was signed by Dabope Producciones to be part of the main cast of the play Journey of Madness (2012–2013) at the Holiday Theater, where she played Elmer's girlfriend (Freddy Villareal). In 2013, she was part of the staff of dancers of the program Susana Giménez broadcast by Telefe.

In 2014, Sánchez gained popularity in the media by participating in the 2014 edition of Dancing for a Dream, where she accompanied the actor Diego Reinhold, in which she performed even more public about his sentimental relationship with Pablo "El Chato" Prada, one of the program's producers and where his rivalry with the dancer Laurita Fernández became known. That same year, he joined the cast of the play Casaphantom, where he shared the bill with Pedro Alfonso, Benjamín Amadeo, Luciana Salazar and Lizy Tagliani. There she played Romina, a role for which she won the award of the Summer Girl awarded by the VOS Awards. In 2015, she again participated in the 2015 edition of Dancing for a Dream as a partner of the actor Fernando Dente, who became the twentieth couple eliminated from the contest after losing the telephone duel with actor Federico Bal. That year, Lourdes played Nicole in the play Marcianos en la casa directed by Carlos Olivieri, this role led her to her first nomination at the Carlos Awards for Best Supporting Actress. During that same summer season she participated as a panelist in the Cordoba program El chaos show.

In 2016, she got the opportunity to host her own children's show entitled El Universo de Lourdes, which was broadcast in the mornings of América TV and had her own album of music of her It also received a nomination for the Martín Fierro Awards in 2017 as Best Children's / Youth Program and had its theatrical adaptation for the summer season in Carlos Paz. Parallel to her work on television, Lourdes participated in the dance show Bien Argentino  between 2016 and 2017. She is also summoned for the first time as a figure to participate in the 2017 edition of Dancing for a dream, where she turned out to be one of the semifinalists of the competition. In 2018, after making several temporary replacements, Ángel de Brito called her to officiate as a stable panelist in his u program of shows LAM. In turn, she participated in the Bailando 2018 as a celebrity along with the actor Diego Ramos, turning out to be the sixteenth couple eliminated after losing in the telephone vote with the athlete Micaela Viciconte and the actress María del Cerro.

In 2019, Sánchez participates again in Dancing for a Dream in his fourteenth season with actor Federico Bal. In turn, she was one of the protagonists of the play Únicas, Puertas del Amor with Sandra Mihanovich, Valeria Archimó, Anita Martínez and Cecilia Figaredo at the Broadway theater. She is currently the host of the program The preview of The Academy broadcast by the cable signal Ciudad Magazine together with Lizardo Ponce, Celeste Muriega, Gabriel Fernández (producer of the program) and Martín Salwe.

Personal life 
Since 2011, Sánchez has been in a relationship with television and theater producer Pablo "El Chato" Prada, with whom she had a son in 2016, whom they named Valentín.

Filmography

Television

Radius

Theater

Advertisements
 Contractil (2022)

Discography 

 Album

 The Universe of Lourdes (2016)

Awards and nominations

References

External links 
 
 
 

Living people
1986 births
Argentine women singers
Argentine female dancers
Argentine actresses
Bailando por un Sueño (Argentine TV series) participants
Bailando por un Sueño (Argentine TV series) BAR members